Burray is one of the Orkney Islands in Scotland. It lies to the east of Scapa Flow and is one of a chain of islands linked by the Churchill Barriers.

Geography and geology

Burray lies between Mainland, Orkney and South Ronaldsay, and is linked to both by the Churchill Barriers. Barriers 1, 2, and 3 connect Burray with Mainland, Orkney via the islets of Glimps Holm and Lamb Holm in Holm Sound to the north east. Barrier 4 links to South Ronaldsay, across Water Sound. To the west is the tidal island of Hunda, also joined by a causeway.

In 2001, the population of Burray was 357, a total that had grown to 409 by 2011. The main settlement, Burray Village, is a former fishing port on the south west coast. There are also settlements of Northtown, Southtown and Hillside on the island.

Burray is made up of Old Red Sandstone of the Devonian period. The island is indented in the north west by Echnaloch Bay, which takes its name from Echna Loch. Burray Ness and Burray Haas are two headlands in the east.

Visitor attractions
Attractions in Burray include the Fossil and Heritage Centre at Viewforth.

The island has a reasonable amount of birdlife, with Eurasian curlew, herring and lesser black-backed gulls breeding here.

History

Viking history
One of the largest Viking hoards in Scotland was discovered on 22 April 1889 by Mr G. Petrie, Little Wart, Burray when he was peat-cutting in the North Town Moss. It consisted of over 140 items of silver bullion, including many fragments of arm ring or 'ring-money', and about a dozen coins The date proposed for deposition is c. 998.

Sir James Stewart
During the early 18th century, the laird of Burray was one Sir James Stewart. Stewart is said to have been involved with a murder in Kirkwall in 1725, and went on the run for twenty years. A Jacobite sympathiser, he ended up fighting in the Battle of Culloden in 1746, and was one of the few survivors. However, when he returned to Burray after the battle, he happened to chance upon the son of the murder victim, who reported him to the authorities. Stewart was arrested, and ended up dying in a prison cell in London.

The novelist Mary Brunton was born Mary Balfour on Burray on 1 November 1778.

WWII and construction of Churchill Barriers

On 14 October 1939, the Royal Navy battleship  was sunk at her moorings within the natural harbour of Scapa Flow, by the  under the command of Günther Prien. U-47 had entered Scapa Flow through Holm Sound, just to the north of Burray, one of several eastern entrances to Scapa Flow. The eastern passages were protected by measures including sunken block ships, booms and anti-submarine nets, but U-47 entered at night at high tide by navigating between the block ships.
 
To prevent further attacks, the First Lord of the Admiralty, Winston Churchill ordered the construction of permanent barriers. Work began in May 1940 and the barriers were completed in September 1944, but were not officially opened until 12 May 1945, four days after the end of World War II.

The Churchill Barriers project required a substantial labour force, which peaked in 1943 at over two thousand. Much of the labour was provided by around 1200 Italian prisoners of war, who had been captured in the desert war in North Africa, who were transported to Orkney from early 1942 onwards. As the use of POW labour for War Effort works is prohibited under the Geneva Conventions, the works were justified as 'improvements to communications' to the southern Orkney Islands.

The prisoners were accommodated in two camps, some at Camp 34 at Warebanks on Burray and the rest at Camp 60 on Lamb Holm where the famous Italian Chapel was built. Camp 34 had its own chapel but this was destroyed at the end of the war with the rest of the camp. Photos exist of Camp 34's football team and band.

See also 

 List of islands of Scotland

References

External links

 Burray Community Association

Islands of the Orkney Islands